Isometrus thurstoni is a species of scorpion in the family Buthidae. The newly discovered Isometrus species, Isometrus kovariki, from the Western Ghats region of India, is closely related.

References

Animals described in 1893
thurstoni